The United States Spring Swimming Championships are held annually in the spring since 1962. The event is governed by USA Swimming. In the 1960s and 1970s, it was governed by USA Swimming's predecessor, the Amateur Athletic Union, as the AAU Indoor National Swimming Championships or National AAU Short Course Swimming Championships. It was originally a short course yards format; this format was revived in 2016 as the United States Short Course Swimming Championships.

Venues
1962 – Bartlesville, Oklahoma (men's), Sacramento, California (women's)
1963 – New Haven, Connecticut (men's), Berea, Ohio (women's)
1964 – Bartlesville, Oklahoma (men's), Pittsburgh, Pennsylvania (women's)
1965 – New Haven, Connecticut (men's), Los Angeles, California (women's)
1966 – Brandon, Florida (men's), Bartlesville, Oklahoma (women's)
1967 – Dallas, Texas (men's), Fairview, Ohio (women's)
1968 – Greenville, South Carolina (men's), Pittsburgh, Pennsylvania (women's)
1969 – Long Beach, California
1970 – Keating Natatorium in Cincinnati, Ohio
1971 – Pullman, Washington
1972 – Dallas, Texas
1973 – Miami, Florida
1974 – Dallas, Texas
1975 – Keating Natatorium in Cincinnati, Ohio
1976 – Long Beach, California
1977 – Canton, Ohio
1978 – Austin, Texas
1979 – Los Angeles, California
1980 – Austin, Texas
1981 – Cambridge, Massachusetts
1982 – Gainesville, Florida
1983 – Indianapolis, Indiana
1984 – Indianapolis, Indiana
1985 – Los Angeles, California
1986 – Orlando, Florida
1987 – Boca Raton, Florida
1988 – Orlando, Florida
1989 – Chapel Hill, North Carolina (25 yds)
1990 – Nashville, Tennessee (25 yds)
1991 – Federal Way, Washington (50m)
1992 – Indianapolis, Indiana (together with the US Olympic Trials) (50m)
1993 – Nashville, Tennessee (50m)
1994 – Federal Way, Washington (50m)
1995 – Minneapolis, Minnesota (50m)
1996 – Orlando, Florida (50m)
1997 – Buffalo, New York (50m)
1998 – Minneapolis, Minnesota (50m)
1999 – Long Island, New York (50m)
2000 – Federal Way, Washington (50m)
2001 – Austin, Texas (50m)
2002 – Minneapolis, Minnesota (50m)
2003 – Indianapolis, Indiana (50m)
2004 – Orlando, Florida (50m)
2005 – Indianapolis, Indiana (together with the US World Championships Trials) (50m)
2006 – Federal Way, Washington (50m)
2007 – East Meadow, New York (50m)

References

 Men's Winners
 Women's Winners

Spring Championships 
Recurring sporting events established in 1962
National swimming competitions
National championships in the United States